The 2021 Dutch TT (officially known as the Motul TT Assen) was the ninth round of the 2021 Grand Prix motorcycle racing season and the fourth round of the 2021 MotoE World Cup. It was held at the TT Circuit Assen in Assen on 27 June 2021.

Qualifying

MotoGP

Race

MotoGP

Moto2

 Héctor Garzó withdrew from the event after a positive COVID-19 test.

Moto3

MotoE

All bikes manufactured by Energica.

Championship standings after the race
Below are the standings for the top five riders, constructors, and teams after the round.

MotoGP

Riders' Championship standings

Constructors' Championship standings

Teams' Championship standings

Moto2

Riders' Championship standings

Constructors' Championship standings

Teams' Championship standings

Moto3

Riders' Championship standings

Constructors' Championship standings

Teams' Championship standings

MotoE

Notes

References

External links

Dutch
TT
Dutch TT
TT